Buestanmyia is a genus of horse flies in the family Tabanidae.

Distribution
Ecuador.

Species
Buestanmyia chiriboga González, 2021

References

Tabanidae
Diptera of South America
Brachycera genera